Blismes is a commune in the Nièvre department in central France. The commune accommodates one of the finest specimens of Field Elm (Orme champetre) Ulmus minor in France.

Population

See also
Communes of the Nièvre department
Parc naturel régional du Morvan

References

Communes of Nièvre